Arfiya Eri() is a Japanese politician for the Liberal Democratic Party of Uyghur descent.

She was born in Kitakyushu, Fukuoka prefecture. Her father is Uyghur while her mother is of Uzbek descent. She moved to Shanghai at age 10 and Guangzhou at age 11 due to her father's work relocation, and attended the Shanghai American School and the American International School of Gunagzhou, where she was elected high school student body President. She graduated from Georgetown University School of Foreign Service and Georgetown University Graduate School of Foreign Service in Washington, D.C. She speaks seven languages and previously spent time as an official for the Bank of Japan and the United Nations.

She ran as an LDP candidate during the 2022 Japanese House of Councillors election.

Political positions 
She has described her policies as in line with most mainstream LDP positions. She has been vocal about her support for initiatives to promote gender equality in Japan. Eri has noted that female and young politicians are rare in Japan (She was 33 years old as of July 2022), saying that, "We need better representation -- we need young people to feel that they are being represented, that the future is in their hands. Right now, a lot of antagonism comes from the fact that most of the politicians look the same to them."

Eri is strongly anti-authoritarian, a position she says is shaped by the Chinese abuses against Uyghurs in Xinjiang Region.

References 

Living people
Georgetown University alumni
People from Fukuoka
21st-century Japanese women politicians
Uyghur politicians
Liberal Democratic Party (Japan) politicians
Politicians from Fukuoka Prefecture
Year of birth missing (living people)